Unbeautiful is the debut album of Lesley Roy. It was released on September 30, 2008, by Religion Music in her native Ireland and Jive Records elsewhere. It peaked on Billboard's Top Heatseekers chart at No. 5.

Background
Lesley Roy began recording the album during 2007. She described the meaning of the album's name, Unbeautiful, as the title of one of her favorite songs on the album — "I called the album that because it's when I hit rock bottom. It's the question a lot of people ask when they're in a relationship, and it's like 'where was the point where you didn't find me attractive anymore?' It's a universal feeling and an unusual word. A lot of people ask me about it and relate to it. And the world is not perfect right now. "Unbeautiful" seems like a realistic title for a lot of things that are happening."

Track listing

References

External links
Official Myspace
Official Imeem

2008 debut albums
Albums produced by Desmond Child
Albums produced by Dr. Luke
Albums produced by Emanuel Kiriakou
Albums produced by Greg Wells
Albums produced by Max Martin
Albums produced by Rami Yacoub
Jive Records albums